Anna Karolína Schmiedlová was the defending champion, but lost in the second round to Beatriz Haddad Maia.

Amanda Anisimova won her first WTA Tour title, defeating Astra Sharma in the final, 4–6, 6–4, 6–1.

Seeds

Draw

Finals

Top half

Bottom half

Qualifying

Seeds

Qualifiers

Lucky losers

Draw

First qualifier

Second qualifier

Third qualifier

Fourth qualifier

Fifth qualifier

Sixth qualifier

References

External Links
 Main Draw
 Qualifying Draw

Copa Colsanitas - Singles
2019 Singles